Bob Young (born May 4, 1982) is an American businessman, auctioneer, and politician serving as a member of the Ohio House of Representatives. He assumed office on January 1, 2021.

Career 
Prior to serving in the House, Young was a member of the Green, Ohio City Council. He also owns an auctioning company. Young ran for and won the 2020 election for the 36th district of the Ohio House of Representatives, defeating Democratic nominee Matt Shaughnessy.

Personal life 
Young is married and has four children.

References

External links

Republican Party members of the Ohio House of Representatives
21st-century American politicians
Politicians from Akron, Ohio
Living people
People from Green, Ohio
1982 births